Zerah Colburn may refer to:

 Zerah Colburn (mental calculator) (1804–1840), American mathematics prodigy
 Zerah Colburn (locomotive designer) (1832–1870), American steam locomotive designer and railroad author